Toonerville is an unincorporated community in Pike County, in the U.S. state of Kentucky. It in located in United States - some 301 mi (or 485 km) West of Washington, the country's capital. It is part of a bigger unincorporated community called Mouthcard

History
The community was named after Toonerville Folks, a comic strip.

References

Unincorporated communities in Pike County, Kentucky
Unincorporated communities in Kentucky